This is a list of Japanese football J1 League transfers in the winter transfer window 2017–18 by club.

Ventforet Kofu 

In:

Out:

Albirex Niigata 

In:

Out:

Omiya Ardija 

In:

Out:

Avispa Fukuoka 

In:

Out:

Tokyo Verdy 

In:

Out:

JEF United Chiba 

In:

Out:

Tokushima Vortis 

In:

Out:

Matsumoto Yamaga 

In:

Out:

Oita Trinita 

In:

Out:

Yokohama FC 

In:

Out:

Montedio Yamagata 

In:

Out:

Kyoto Sanga 

In:

Out:

Fagiano Okayama 

In:

Out:

Mito HollyHock 

In:

Out:

Ehime FC 

In:

Out:

Machida Zelvia 

In:

Out:

Zweigen Kanazawa 

In:

Out:

FC Gifu 

In:

Out:

Kamatamare Sanuki 

In:

Out:

Renofa Yamaguchi 

In:

Out:

Roasso Kumamoto 

In:

Out:

Tochigi SC 

In:

Out:

References

2017-18
Transfers
Japan